Rübsaamen is a German surname. Notable people with the surname include:

 Dieter Rübsaamen (born 1937), German artist
 Ewald Heinrich Rübsaamen (1857–1919), German teacher, artist, and entomologist

German-language surnames